Ipava is a village in Fulton County, Illinois, United States. The population was 470 at the 2010 census.

Geography
Ipava is located in southern Fulton County at  (40.352123, -90.323343). U.S. Route 136 passes through the village, leading east  to Havana on the Illinois River and west  to Table Grove.

History
Ipava was platted in 1846, at the time called Pleasantville. It was renamed to Ipava in 1853 when it was incorporated.

Demographics

As of the census of 2000, there were 506 people, 222 households, and 144 families residing in the village. The racial makeup of the village was 99.60% White, 0.20% Asian, and 0.20% from two or more races. Hispanic or Latino of any race were 0.40% of the population.

There were 222 households, out of which 24.8% had children under the age of 18 living with them, 55.4% were married couples living together, 6.3% had a female householder with no husband present, and 34.7% were non-families. 33.3% of all households were made up of individuals, and 18.5% had someone living alone who was 65 years of age or older. The average household size was 2.28 and the average family size was 2.90.

In the village, the population was spread out, with 23.5% under the age of 18, 6.5% from 18 to 24, 26.1% from 25 to 44, 25.1% from 45 to 64, and 18.8% who were 65 years of age or older. The median age was 40 years. For every 100 females, there were 101.6 males. For every 100 females age 18 and over, there were 98.5 males.

The median income for a household in the village was $31,250, and the median income for a family was $41,389. Males had a median income of $34,063 versus $22,679 for females. The per capita income for the village was $16,007. About 9.0% of families and 10.1% of the population were below the poverty line, including 16.8% of those under age 18 and 9.3% of those age 65 or over.

Notable people 

 Jack Fisk, actor and director, married to actress Sissy Spacek; born to Jack Fisk Sr. and Geraldine Fisk of Ipava on December 19, 1945
 Frank Lovell, politician with the Socialist Workers Party; born in Ipava

References

Villages in Fulton County, Illinois
Villages in Illinois
1846 establishments in Illinois